Steven Mee (born 6 April 1965) was an English cricketer. He was a right-handed batsman and right-arm medium-pace bowler who played for Nottinghamshire. He was born in Nottingham.

Mee, who played with Nottinghamshire Second XI between 1983 and 1984, made a single first-class appearance for the side, against Cambridge University in 1984. Mee took two wickets in the match but did not bat.

External links
Steven Mee at Cricket Archive

1965 births
Living people
English cricketers
Nottinghamshire cricketers
Cricketers from Nottingham